"Bad Boy" is a song by punk band the Adicts, released as a single by Razor Records in May 1983. It was released as a standard black vinyl 7-inch single and also as a 7-inch picture disc with one additional track. The single was the band's biggest hit, reaching No. 75 on the UK Singles Chart and No. 4 on the UK Independent Chart. This brought major label interest to the band, which led to their next single being released by the Warner imprint Sire Records. "Bad Boy" was included on the band's next studio album, Smart Alex, while both B-sides originally appeared on Sound of Music.

Track listing
 "Bad Boy"
 "Shake Rattle Bang Your Head"
 "Joker in the Pack" (picture disc only)

Personnel

The Adicts
 Keith "Monkey" Warren - Vocals
 Pete "Pete Dee" Davison - Guitar  
 Mel "Spider" Ellis - Bass
 Michael "Kid Dee" Davison - Drums

References

The Adicts songs
1983 singles
1983 songs